Indian Express Limited is an Indian news media publishing company. It publishes several widely circulated dailies, including The Indian Express and The Financial Express in English, the Loksatta in Marathi and the Jansatta in Hindi. The company's newspapers are published from over a dozen cities daily, including New Delhi, Mumbai, Ahmedabad, Bengaluru, Kolkata, Pune, Chandigarh, Hyderabad, Kochi, Lucknow, Jaipur, Nagpur, Vadodara and Chennai. Its weekly entertainment magazine Screen, covering Indian film industry, also has a popular following.

On 2 November 2006, the Indian Express Group signed a print syndication deal with The Economist, which included allowing the Indian Express Group to publish surveys, some reports, and various other content published in The Economist magazine.

Publications

The following brands and concerns are owned by the Group:
 Indian Express - a national daily (English)
 The Sunday Express - a news weekly
 The Financial Express - a business daily
 Loksatta - Marathi daily
 Lokprabha - Marathi weekly
 Jansatta - Hindi daily for North India
 Screen - Periodical dealing with the film and entertainment industry
 Express Online - the portal for hosting IndianExpress.com, FinancialExpress.com, ScreenIndia.com, tamil.indianexpress.com, Jansatta.com, Loksatta.com and Lokprabha.com,  ExpressCricket.in, and KashmirLive.com

Other ventures

Business Publications Division
Established in 1990, the division manages leading B2B publications and events catering to major industry verticals like Information Technology, Hospitality & Travel, Pharma & Healthcare, etc.

Express Towers 
Indian Express Limited earlier owned a 25-storey building named Gali Desawar Company at Marine Drive, Mumbai. The building houses offices of several corporate entities. In the year 2018, Pune based Panchsheel bought the building for 900 crores.

References

External links
 

 
Newspaper companies of India
Book publishing companies of India
Magazine publishing companies of India
Mass media companies of India
Mass media companies based in Delhi
Companies based in New Delhi
Publishing companies established in 1932
1932 establishments in British India
Privately held companies of India
Indian companies established in 1932